Discoverer 32, also known as Corona 9025, was an American optical reconnaissance satellite which was launched in 1961. It was a KH-3 Corona''' satellite, based on an Agena-B.

The launch of Discoverer 32 occurred at 19:22 UTC on 13 October 1961. A Thor DM-21 Agena-B rocket was used, flying from Launch Complex 75-3-4 at the Vandenberg Air Force Base. Upon successfully reaching orbit, it was assigned the Harvard designation 1961 Alpha Gamma 1.

Images were recorded onto  film, and returned in a Satellite Recovery Vehicle, which was deorbited one day after launch. The Satellite Recovery Vehicle used by Discoverer 32 was SRV-555. Following the return of its images, Discoverer 32 remained in orbit until it decayed on 13 November 1961. Most of the images it produced were found to have been out of focus.

References

Spacecraft launched in 1961
Spacecraft which reentered in 1961